Zach Reid (born 2 March 2002) is an Australian rules footballer who plays for  in the Australian Football League (AFL).

Early football
Reid came from Leongatha, where he played for the Leongatha Football Club in the Gippsland Football League. He played 36 games for the club between 2017 and 2020, kicking 35 goals in that time. He played for the Gippsland Power in the NAB League, alongside future draftees Caleb Serong and Sam Flanders, after previously playing for them in the Under 16 squads. He played 15 games with the Power, averaging 11 disposals, 4 marks and 2 tackles a game.

AFL career
Reid stated that he based his playing style off that of All-Australian Harris Andrews. On debut, Reid collected 10 disposals, 1 mark and 5 tackles.

Statistics
 Statistics are correct to the end of round 6, 2021.

|- style="background-color: #EAEAEA"
! scope="row" style="text-align:center" | 2021
|
| 31 || 1 || 0 || 0 || 5 || 5 || 10 || 1 || 5 || 0.0 || 0.0 || 5.0 || 5.0 || 10.0 || 1.0 || 5.0
|- class="sortbottom"
! colspan=3| Career
! 1
! 0
! 0
! 5
! 5
! 10
! 1
! 5
! 0.0 
! 0.0 
! 5.0
! 5.0 
! 10.0 
! 1.0
! 5.0
|}

References

2002 births
Living people
Essendon Football Club players
Gippsland Power players
Australian rules footballers from Victoria (Australia)